Three Comrades is a 1938 drama film directed by Frank Borzage and produced by Joseph L. Mankiewicz for MGM. The screenplay is by F. Scott Fitzgerald and Edward E. Paramore Jr., and was adapted from the novel Three Comrades by Erich Maria Remarque. It tells the story of the friendship of three young German soldiers following World War I, during the Weimar Republic and the rise of Nazism.

The film stars Robert Taylor, Margaret Sullavan, Franchot Tone and Robert Young. Sullavan was nominated for the Academy Award for Best Actress.

Plot
On the last day of World War I, November 11, 1918, three German fighter pilots - Erich Lohkamp, Otto Koster, and Gottfried Lenz - are having a final drink with their compatriots.  They toast each other, expressing fatalistic attitudes about the future.  With their only hope being in their friendship, the three comrades open a taxi and auto repair business and are barely able to eke out a living.  

One day several years later (1920), while driving to a country inn in Otto's precious souped-up jalopy roadster, "Baby", to celebrate Erich's birthday (the youngest and least cynical of the three), the friends get into a back road car race with a Herr Breuer, who is driving a luxury car, accompanied by Patricia Hollmann. The boys win their little race and they - along with Breuer and Pat - all arrive at the country inn together.  While drinking together, the friends learn that Pat is a young German aristocrat who is now impoverished, while Breuer is a rich fascist sympathizer seeking a sugar daddy relationship with Pat.  Though Pat is worldly, she is drawn to the innocent Erich, and gives him her telephone number.  Otto and Gottfried encourage the relationship, feeling that their love will be the group's only salvation, but Erich feels that Pat's background will keep them apart, so he tells his friends he has thrown away Pat's number.  Nevertheless, Erich - with strong encouragement from Gottfried - eventually calls Pat (he had not thrown away her number after all), and the two agree to a date. 

Pat and Erich start seeing each other and, one night, Pat invites Erich to the opera, where they run into Breuer.  Breuer invites them to join him at a fancy nightclub, where Erich's borrowed formal white tie & tails starts to disintegrate, to the taunting laughter of Breuer and his drunken, rich friends. Erich leaves in embarrassment, thinking his poor status shames him in Pat's eyes.  But later that night, he finds Pat waiting for him outside his apartment, where she convinces him that her feelings for him are stronger than any difference in their social or economic situation - and the two realize that they are truly and equally in love.  

Some time later, both Gottfried and Otto separately do their best to persuade Pat and Erich to follow their hearts despite the poverty: Gottfried tries to convince Erich to marry Pat, while Otto tries to convince Pat to marry Erich.  When Pat resists Otto's entreaties and he presses her for an answer, she reveals that she had been very ill and will be ill again because of her lungs (with tuberculosis).  Otto convinces her that she should marry Erich regardless, no matter how brief their happiness might be, and she finally agrees.  

On their honeymoon, Pat collapses as she and Erich (who does not know of her illness) are playing on the beach.  When the local doctor reveals her condition to Erich, and says that she may die if her hemorrhaging does not stop very soon, Erich calls Otto to find Pat's specialist, Dr. Felix Jaffe.  Driving wildly through fog in his beloved "Baby", Otto returns with Dr. Jaffe just in time to save Pat, but the doctor warns that she must go to a sanitarium no later than the middle of October.  

Through the summer, Otto, Erich, Gottfried and Pat are happy together, even though they worry about her health.  The idealistic Gottfried, however, is torn between his devotion to his friends and his belief in the teachings of political pacifist, Dr. Heinrich Becker. On the day that Pat must leave for the sanitarium, Erich and Otto witness a fascist thug shooting Gottfried to death while trying to kill Dr. Becker.  Now faced with the loss of Gottfried as well Pat's absence, Erich and Otto sell their shop and drift through the next months, roaming the streets in "Baby", seeking Gottfried's killer.  At Christmas, Otto finally finds the murderer, trailing him to a church where Handel's Messiah Hallelujah Chorus is being sung, and kills him in a shootout as the chorus reaches its climax.  

That same night, Erich receives a telegram from Pat that she must have an operation to collapse her lung.  Her doctor at the sanitarium warns her that, after the operation, Pat must stay bedridden and very very still for two weeks or endanger her life.  When Otto and Erich visit her, Erich learns about her need for extreme stillness after the operation and that the operation will cost over 1,000 marks.

Erich tells the doctor to proceed with the operation and Otto decides to sell "Baby" to pay for it.  When Otto goes to see her after the operation, he admits that Gottfried is dead and that he has sold "Baby", and she tells him that their self-sacrifices for her must stop, as her need for future care will be endless - and expensive - and will ruin Erich's and Otto's lives.  Otto encourages her to live for Erich and, as they finish speaking, Erich arrives and Otto leaves.  Pat speaks to Erich of the three of them escaping to Rio right away.  Erich tells her to simply focus on getting better and steps outside to say goodbye to Otto.  When alone, Pat slowly walks out to the room's balcony - a simple movement that she knows will likely cause her death.  She is seen from below by Erich as she collapses.  He rushes to her side just in time to hear her say: "It's right for me to die, darling.  It isn't hard...and I'm so full of love."  For the three comrades and Patricia, death is not a repudiation of the love they shared.

After Pat's funeral, as they hear fighting in their city between fascist thugs and pro-democracy protesters, Otto and Erich decide to move to South America.  As they leave the cemetery, you can see the spirits of Gottfried and Pat walking beside them.

Cast
 Robert Taylor as Erich Lohkamp
 Margaret Sullavan as Patricia Hollmann
 Franchot Tone as Otto Koster
 Robert Young as Gottfried Lenz
 Guy Kibbee as Alfons
 Lionel Atwill as Breuer
 Henry Hull as Dr. Becker
 Charley Grapewin as Local Doctor
 Monty Woolley as Dr. Jaffe

Reception
Frank Nugent, critic for The New York Times, called Three Comrades "a beautiful and memorable film. Faithful to the spirit and, largely, to the letter of the novel, it has been magnificently directed, eloquently written, and admirably played." He praised nearly all of the main actors, particularly Sullavan ("Hers is a shimmering, almost unendurably lovely performance."), but was less impressed with Taylor ("who is good occasionally but more often is merely acceptable").

According to MGM records, the film earned $1,193,000 in the United States and Canada and $850,000 elsewhere, resulting in a profit of $472,000.

The film was nominated for the American Film Institute's 2002 list AFI's 100 Years...100 Passions.

References

External links
 
 
 
 

1938 films
1938 drama films
American drama films
American black-and-white films
Films based on German novels
Films based on works by Erich Maria Remarque
Films scored by Franz Waxman
Films directed by Frank Borzage
Films produced by Joseph L. Mankiewicz
Films set in Germany
Films set in 1918
Films set in 1920
Films set in the 1920s
Films with screenplays by F. Scott Fitzgerald
Metro-Goldwyn-Mayer films
1930s English-language films
1930s American films